"Get the Party Started" is a song by American singer Pink, released on October 16, 2001, as the lead single from her second album, Missundaztood (2001). It received positive reviews and became an international success and reached the top ten in many countries, peaking at number one in Australia, Ireland, New Zealand, Romania, Spain, and the Walloon region of Belgium. The song was Pink's biggest-selling song at that time.

In 2003, Q ranked the track at number 185 in their list of the "1001 Best Songs Ever". About.com placed the song at number-one in their list of "The Top 100 Best Party Songs of All Time" in 2019.

Composition

The song was composed by former 4 Non Blondes frontwoman Linda Perry. She said that the process of making the song was "so unlike me"; according to her, she was going through a "weird phase" during which she wanted to learn how to program drums. She programmed her first beat, picked up a bass guitar, and, in her words, "did what the beat was asking me to do." She decided to put "every wrong instrument" in the song, and consequently acquired a horn sample. "I was doing the music, the melody was already coming to me in what I wanted the song to be," she said. She finished the song by including in the song "every catch phrase you possibly could imagine", before laughing at the realization that she had written a potential hit single and her first dance song. "You create something in your bedroom or your house, and it's just a fun thing that you're doing," she said. "Then all of a sudden, you hear that song that you started in your house, and it's on the radio. And people are now acknowledging it. It's just trippy." In 2019, Perry revealed that she had written the song for Madonna, who turned it down.

The entire song uses only one chord, solidly in B minor.

Critical response
AllMusic highlighted the song and added: "This record bubbles over with imagination, as hooky pop songs like the title track rub shoulders with glitzy dancefloor anthems like "Get the Party Started." Jim Farber was favorable: "The single "Get the Party Started" has the tricky synth hook of a perfect new-wave hit from the '80s." NME was less positive, saying it "displays the kind of clod-hopping attention-seeking on single 'Get the Party Started' that makes you assume you're listening to a Geri Halliwell record." Jason Thompson described this song and praised: "the dance inducing "Get the Party Started". Again, even this isn't really in the mold of current dance tracks. Instead, it feels more like the kinds of grooves that were coming out in the early Nineties, when alt-rock was influencing the discos as well as the college charts. In fact, it sounds a little like Apollo Smile who had an album out back in '91 or so. "Get the Party Started" also echoes the good time vibe that other hits like Deee-Lite's "Groove Is in the Heart" had that won over many fans. This track should do just the same thing. It did for me, anyway."

Slant Magazine called this song "retro-dipped dance-pop." Sputnikmusic marked it as a highlight and added: "It is not all slow and serious going though, as 1st single 'Get The Party Started' proves. As the song title suggests, this is the dance-oriented party-starter that the artist's debut album lacked." Stylus magazine called the song "near perfection."

Commercial performance
"Get the Party Started" reached number four on the US Billboard Hot 100 on December 29, 2001, becoming one of Pink's biggest solo hits in the US with "Most Girls" also reaching number four on the Billboard Hot 100 in 2000 and "So What", "Raise Your Glass", and "Just Give Me a Reason" reaching number one in 2008, 2010, and 2013 respectively, and "Fuckin' Perfect" that reached number two in America. The single's success was spurred by heavy airplay in the US, which prompted the song to also peak at number four on Billboard's Radio Songs chart. The song peaked at number two in the UK, where it was certified platinum for sales and streams exceeding 600,000 units. The song reached number one in Australia and number two in many European countries, including Austria, Germany, Italy, and Switzerland.

"Get the Party Started" is certified platinum in Australia, Canada, Norway, and the UK and gold in Austria, Germany, France, Sweden, and Switzerland. The song was nominated for a Grammy Award in 2003 in the category of "Best Female Pop Vocal Performance", which it lost to Norah Jones's "Don't Know Why". It won the award for "Favorite Song" at the Kids' Choice Awards of 2002, and at the MTV Europe Music Awards of 2002, it won the award for "Best Song". "Get the Party Started" is often considered one of Pink's signature songs as she tends to finish her shows with this song in her encore section along with a ballad song such as "Nobody Knows" and "Glitter In The Air". In December, the song was listed as number 81 on Rolling Stone's Top Songs of the 2000s.

Music video
The music video was shot by director Dave Meyers in Los Angeles. It was filmed from September 22 to 24, 2001. The video uses an abbreviated version of the song, cutting out the last chorus as well as the instrumentals. Perry is seen as a bartender.

In the video, Pink is getting ready to go out, trying on different outfits. One of her friends picks her up, and they drive in a car bobbing their heads to the music. However, the car runs out of fuel, so they get out and steal two skateboards from two boys. Pink falls off her skateboard because men in a car are whistling at her. The women arrive at the club but are refused entry, so to get in they use a scaffold to reach the top of the building. Inside the club, Pink changes her clothes and starts to party; in the end Pink dances with two other dancers (Kevin Federline and Georvohn Lambert).

The video was nominated at the 2002 MTV Video Music Awards for "Best Pop Video" and won the awards for "Best Female Video" and "Best Dance Video".

Remixes
Pink teamed up with Redman and Rockwilder for a remix of "Get the Party Started" using elements of the Eurythmics song "Sweet Dreams (Are Made of This)", titled "Get the Party Started/Sweet Dreams". It is included as the B-side on several single releases. Pink performed the remix during her I'm Not Dead Tour in 2006 and 2007.

Awards

Track listings

 UK CD1 and cassette single
 "Get the Party Started" (radio mix) – 3:12
 "Get the Party Started/Sweet Dreams" (featuring Redman) – 4:05
 "Get the Party Started" (radio mix instrumental) – 3:12

 UK CD2
 "Get the Party Started" (radio mix) – 3:12
 "Get the Party Started" (K5 Werk Kraft Mix featuring Spoonface) – 7:02
 "Get the Party Started" (P!nk Noise Disco Mix radio edit) – 3:44
 "Get the Party Started" (video) – 3:21

 European CD single
 "Get the Party Started" (radio mix) – 3:12
 "Get the Party Started/Sweet Dreams" (featuring Redman) – 4:05

 Australian and New Zealand CD single
 "Get the Party Started" (radio mix) – 3:12
 "Get the Party Started/Sweet Dreams" (featuring Redman) – 4:04
 "Get the Party Started" (P!nk Noise Disco Mix radio edit) – 3:44
 "Get the Party Started" (instrumental) – 3:14

Credits and personnel
Credits are taken from the Missundaztood album booklet.

Studios
 Recorded at LP Studios (Sherman Oaks, Los Angeles)
 Additional recording at Larrabee Studios (Los Angeles)
 Mixed at The Enterprise (Burbank, California)
 Mastered at Hit Factory Mastering (New York City)

Personnel
 Linda Perry – writing, all instruments, drum programming, production, recording
 Pink – vocals, background vocals
 Bernd Burgdorf – additional recording, Pro Tools programming
 Dave "Hard Drive" Pensado – mixing
 Dave Guerrero – mixing assistant
 Herb Powers Jr. – mastering

Charts

Weekly charts

Year-end charts

Certifications

}

Release history

Shirley Bassey version

Shirley Bassey recorded a cover for a spy-themed 2006 Marks & Spencer Christmas television advertising campaign. Her version became a cult hit and was included on her 2007 album, also titled Get the Party Started. The Guardian wrote, "Bassey is the only singer alive who could take the bouncing, enthusiastic R&B of the original Get the Party Started and turn it into a grand, imperious swoop worthy of a Bond theme; it's a terrific cover version, even if it perhaps didn't quite merit the album attached to it."

On January 13, 2008, Bassey's version was used in the opening sequence to the ITV1 series Dancing on Ice. It was also used in the promo for Cycle 4 of Australia's Next Top Model, and Bassey's version charted at number 47 in the UK and ended at the Billboard Year-End Charts at number forty-three in the Hot Dance Club Plays Tracks of the year, having peaked at number 3 in April 2008. The track was used again in 2010 for the opening credits of Cats & Dogs: The Revenge of Kitty Galore.  The track was also used for 2015 commercial of Honda Stepwgn.

Track listings and formats
UK CD single
 "Get The Party Started" (Radio edit) – 3:08
 "Get The Party Started" – 4:02
 "Get The Party Started" (NorthXNorthWest Club mix) – 7:21
 "Get The Party Started" (Fugitives Coming Up mix) – 5:34
 "Get The Party Started" (Flip & Fill remix) – 5:58
 "Get The Party Started" (Music video) – 4:00

US Digital single
 "Get The Party Started" (Chris Cox Club mix) – 8:45 
 "Get The Party Started" (Chris Cox Dub mix) – 8:05
 "Get The Party Started" (Chris Cox Radio mix) – 3:49

Charts

See also
 List of Romanian Top 100 number ones of the 2000s

References

2001 singles
2001 songs
2007 singles
Arista Records singles
LaFace Records singles
Dance-pop songs
European Hot 100 Singles number-one singles
Irish Singles Chart number-one singles
MTV Video Music Award for Best Female Video
Music videos directed by Dave Meyers (director)
Number-one singles in Australia
Number-one singles in New Zealand
Number-one singles in Romania
Number-one singles in Spain
Pink (singer) songs
Shirley Bassey songs
Songs written by Linda Perry
Ultratop 50 Singles (Wallonia) number-one singles
2002 singles
Songs about parties